Juliette Binoche is a French actress, artist and dancer who throughout her career has received several awards and nominations including one Academy Award, one BAFTA Award and a César Award. In 1993, she starred in Three Colors: Blue, the first instalment of Krzysztof Kieślowski's Three Colours trilogy, for this performance she was nominated for the Golden Globe Award for Best Actress in a Motion Picture – Drama and won the César Award for Best Actress (her first and only César Award to date out of ten nominations) and the Volpi Cup for Best Actress at the 50th Venice International Film Festival. She gained further international acclaim for her performance in  Anthony Minghella's period film The English Patient (1996) for which she won the Academy Award for Best Supporting Actress, the BAFTA Award for Best Supporting Actress and the Silver Bear for Best Actress at the 49th Berlin International Film Festival. She received her second Academy Award nomination for Lasse Hallström's romantic comedy Chocolat (2000), this time for Best Actress. In 2001 she was nominated for the Tony Award for Best Actress in a Play for her role in the 2000's Broadway revival of Harold Pinter's play Betrayal.  At the 2010 Cannes Film Festival she won Best Actress for her performance in Abbas Kiarostami's 2010 art film Certified Copy, becoming the first actress to complete the “Europe’s Triple Crown“ (winning at all three most prestigious film festivals: Berlin, Cannes, and Venice film festivals for the same categories) for the category of Best Actress.

Major associations

Academy Awards
The Academy Awards are a set of awards given by the Academy of Motion Picture Arts and Sciences annually for excellence of cinematic achievements.

British Academy Film Awards
The British Academy Film Award is an annual award show presented by the British Academy of Film and Television Arts.

Golden Globe Awards
The Golden Globe Award is an accolade bestowed by the 93 members of the Hollywood Foreign Press Association (HFPA) recognizing excellence in film and television, both domestic and foreign.

Screen Actors Guild Awards
The Screen Actors Guild Awards (also known as SAG Awards) are accolades given by the Screen Actors Guild-American Federation of Television and Radio Artists (SAG-AFTRA) to recognize outstanding performances in film and prime time television.

Tony Awards
The Tony Awards are presented by the American Theatre Wing and The Broadway League to recognize excellence in live Broadway theatre.

Festival awards

Berlin Film Festival
The Berlin Film Festival, is an annual film festival held in Berlin, Germany.

Cannes Film Festival
The Cannes Film Festival, is an annual film festival held in Cannes, France.

Venice Film Festival
The Venice Film Festival, is an annual film festival held in Venice, Italy.

International awards

César Awards
The César Awards are the national film awards of France presented by Académie des Arts et Techniques du Cinéma.

Goya Awards

European Film Awards
The European Film Awards are presented annually by the European Film Academy to recognize excellence in European cinematic achievements.

Lumières Awards
The Lumières Award is a French film award presented by the Académie des Lumières.

Special awards
 1986 – Prix Romy Schneider
 2010 – Kerry Film Festival – Maureen O'Hara Award
 2010 – Cairo International Film Festival – Lifetime achievement
 2014 – Manaki Brothers Film Festival – Special Golden Camera 300 for contribution in world the Art of Cinema
 2014 – Locarno International Film Festival – Excellence Award Moët & Chandon

Various awards and critics associations

References

External links
 

Binoche, Juliette